Boodua is a rural locality in the Toowoomba Region, Queensland, Australia. In the  Boodua had a population of 93 people.

Geography
Part of the eastern and southern boundary of Boodua follows Oakey Creek, a tributary of the Condamine River.  The predominant land use is agriculture.

History

The name originates from the Boodua railway station on the Haden railway line and is an Aboriginal word for a species of hawk.

East Lynne Provisional School opened on 1 October 1908. On 1 January 1909 it became East Lynne State School. In 1926, it was renamed Boodua State School. It closed on 29 January 1963. It was at 5 Boodua West Road.

The Boodua Public Hall opened in 1909. It was originally known as the East Lynne Hall.

On Sunday 14 September 1913 the East Lynne Methodist Church was officially opened by Reverend W. Goddard of Toowoomba. In 1977, as part of the creation of the Uniting Church in Australia, the East Lynne Methodist congregation merged with the Goombungee Congregational Church to form the Goombungee Uniting Church (which closed on 26 August 2012). The East Lynne Methodist Church no longer exists.

The Darling Downs Co-operative Dairy Association operated a cheese factory at Boodua between 1926 and 1950.

The area was once part of the Shire of Rosalie until it was merged into the Toowoomba Region in 2008.

In the  Boodua had a population of 93 people.

Amenities 

The Boodua Public Hall is at 1473 Kingsthorpe Haden Road (corner of Boodua West Road).

References

Further reading 

  — includes Gowrie Little Plains School, Aubigny School, Crosshill School, Devon Park State School, Silverleigh State School, Boodua School, Greenwood State School, Kelvinhaugh State School

External links 

Toowoomba Region
Shire of Rosalie
Localities in Queensland